A Child Is Born is a 1939 American drama film directed by Lloyd Bacon and written by Robert Rossen. The film stars Geraldine Fitzgerald, Jeffrey Lynn, Gladys George, Gale Page, Spring Byington, and Johnnie Davis. The film was released by Warner Bros. on December 17, 1939. It was a remake of the 1932 film Life Begins starring Loretta Young. A further remake Love Story was made in Italy in 1942.

Plot
Film about several mothers at hospital maternity ward. The nurses care for the mothers and their new born babies. The relationship that are formed with the mothers to be and the expectant fathers.

Cast

Censorship
Numerous regional censor boards heavily edited or banned the film because they believed its discussions of childbirth would frighten women from pursuing motherhood. British Columbia rejected the film because "The showing of this picture would have the effect of creating a fear in the minds of expectant mothers."

References

External links
 
 
 
 

1939 films
1939 drama films
American black-and-white films
American drama films
1930s English-language films
Films directed by Lloyd Bacon
Films set in hospitals
American pregnancy films
Warner Bros. films
Films scored by Heinz Roemheld
Films with screenplays by Robert Rossen
1930s pregnancy films
1930s American films